The Ministry of Electricity and Energy is a cabinet ministry of Yemen.

Ministers 

 The current minister is Mana'a Saleh Yaslam, (28 July 2022– )
 Anwar Mohamed Ali Kalshat, ( 18 December 2020– 27 July 2022)

See also 
 Cabinet of Yemen

References 

Government ministries of Yemen